Les Chutes-de-la-Chaudière-Ouest is a borough of the city of Lévis, Quebec.  It was created on January 1, 2002.

It corresponds to the western part of the former Les Chutes-de-la-Chaudière Regional County Municipality.

It has three districts, corresponding to former municipalities:
 Saint-Étienne-de-Lauzon
 Saint-Nicolas
 Saint-Rédempteur

References

Boroughs of Lévis, Quebec